Rivers Solomon is an American author of speculative and literary fiction. In 2018, they received the Community of Literary Magazines and Presses' Firecracker Award in Fiction for their debut novel, An Unkindness of Ghosts, and in 2020 their second novel, The Deep, won the Lambda Literary Award. Their third novel, Sorrowland, was published in May 2021.

Personal life 
Solomon is non-binary and intersex and states that they use fae/faer and they/them pronouns. They describe themself as "a dyke, an anarchist, a she-beast, an exile, a shiv, a wreck, and a refugee of the Trans-Atlantic Slave Trade." They have attention deficit hyperactivity disorder and are on the autism spectrum.

As of 2018, Solomon lives in Cambridge, UK, with their family. Originally from the United States, they received their BA in Comparative Studies in Race and Ethnicity from Stanford University in California and an MFA in Fiction Writing from the Michener Center for Writers at the University of Texas at Austin. They grew up in California, Indiana, Texas, and New York. Their literary influences include Ursula Le Guin, Octavia Butler, Alice Walker, Zora Neale Hurston, Ray Bradbury, Jean Toomer, and Doris Lessing.

Work
Solomon's debut novel was An Unkindness of Ghosts, a science fiction novel exploring the conjunction between structural racism and generation ships. It was published in 2017 by Akashic Books. The book was a best book of 2017 in The Guardian, NPR, Publishers Weekly, Library Journal, Bustle, and others, as well as a Stonewall Honor Book, Firecracker winner, and a finalist for the Locus, Lambda, Tiptree, John W. Campbell Award for Best New Writer, and Hurston/Wright awards.

Amal El-Mohtar wrote of An Unkindness of Ghosts, "Reading it, I felt it carving out a vastness inside me, pouring itself into me like so many stars, and the more I read the bigger I felt, falling down a rabbit-hole of sky and wanting only to go deeper and farther with every page." Gary K. Wolfe opined "All this might make An Unkindness of Ghosts sound like a programmatic slavery allegory dressed in generation starship trappings, but Solomon’s evocation of this society is so sharply detailed and viscerally realized, the characters so closely observed, the individual scenes so tightly structured, that the novel achieves surprising power and occasional brilliance."

Their second book, The Deep, (2019, Saga Press), is based on the Hugo-nominated song of the same name by the experimental hip-hop group Clipping, and depicts a utopian underwater society built by the water-breathing descendants of pregnant slaves thrown overboard from slave ships. The Deep won the 2020 Lambda Award and was shortlisted for the Nebula, Locus, and Hugo awards.

On October 3, 2019, it was announced that MCD Books had acquired Solomon's next book, Sorrowland, which was published in May 2021. Sorrowland is described as "a genre-bending work of gothic fiction that wrestles with the tangled history of racism in America and the marginalization of society’s undesirables."  In a review, Hephzidah Anderson succinctly captures the residual emotions this book evokes, writing "It’s about escape, self-acceptance and queer love. It’s about genocide and the exploitation of black bodies, self-delusion and endemic corruption, motherhood and inheritance."

Solomon's shorter work has been featured in Black Warrior Review, The New York Times, Guernica, Best American Short Stories, Tor.com, and elsewhere. They collaborated with authors Yoon Ha Lee, Becky Chambers, and S. L. Huang on the serial novel The Vela.

References

External links 

Interview with Rivers Solomon, Pen America, October 24, 2019

Reception

An Unkindness of Ghosts 

 El-Mohtar, Amal, "'Unkindness Of Ghosts' Transposes The Plantation's Cruelty To The Stars," NPR, October 6, 2017
 Hines, Aries, Lambda Literary, November 2, 2017
 Publishers Weekly, August 14, 2017
 McArdle, Megan, Library Journal, September 15, 2017

The Deep 

 Heller, Jason "'The Deep' Sings With Many Voices," NPR, November 7, 2019
 Publishers Weekly, April 15, 2019
 Brown, Alex, "Wade in the Water," TOR, November 5, 2019

Sorrowland 

 Anderson, Hephzibah, The Guardian, May 18, 2021
 Lore, Danny, NPR, May 14, 2021
 Jackson, Matthew, Book Page, May 2021

1989 births
African-American novelists
LGBT African Americans
Living people
Stanford University alumni
Michener Center for Writers alumni
21st-century American novelists
American science fiction writers
Lambda Literary Award winners
21st-century African-American writers
20th-century African-American people
American non-binary writers
People on the autism spectrum
People with attention deficit hyperactivity disorder